Mareuil-sur-Ay (literally Mareuil on Ay) is a former commune in the Marne department in north-eastern France. Since January 2016, Mareuil-sur-Aÿ is part of the administrative commune Aÿ-Champagne. Its population was 1,113 in 2019.

The patron saint is Saint Trésain.

Champagne
Its vineyards are located in the Vallée de la Marne subregion of Champagne, and are classified as Premier Cru (99%) in the Champagne vineyard classification. Together with Tauxières-Mutry it is the highest rated of the Premier Cru villages, and has therefore just missed out on Grand Cru (100%) status.
 Regardless, the vineyards, harvest huts, presses, and cellars in Mareuil-sur-Ay were inscribed on the UNESCO World Heritage List in 2015 as part of the Champagne hillsides, houses and cellars site, because of the region's testimony to the development of champagne.

See also
 Billecart-Salmon
Communes of the Marne department
Montagne de Reims Regional Natural Park

References

Mareuilsuray